Antras (Antràs in Occitan) is a commune in the Ariège department in the Occitanie region of southwestern France.

The inhabitants of the commune are known as Antrasois or Antrasoises.

Geography
Antras is located some 25 km south-east of Saint-Gaudens, 20 km north-east of Bagneres-de-Luchon, and only 1 km from the Spanish border.  It was part of the former province of Couserans in the Biros Valley.  No district roads or highways pass through the commune and the only access to the village is by a mountain road (the Route d'Antras) from the D4 road at Sentein. There are few roads in the commune with some mountain tracks and unformed roads. The commune is mountainous and heavily forested.

The Ruisseau d'Antras flows from the commune down to Sentein where it joins the Lez which continues to Saint-Girons where it joins the Salat river.

Neighbouring communes and villages

Administration

List of Successive Mayors of Antras

Population

Sites and Monuments
A Marble Cross (1785) is registered as an historical monument.
 A Romanesque Parish Church. The church contains several items that are registered as historical objects:
6 Candlesticks (18th century)
An Altar, Retable, Tabernacle, Altar dais, a Painting, and 2 Statues (18th century)
A Sculpture: Chrisme (12th century)
A Chalice with Paten (19th century)
An Ampulla of Saint Chrême (19th century)
A Statue: Virgin and child (18th century)

See also
 Communes of the Ariège department

References

External links
 Antras on the old National Geographic Institute website 
Antras on Géoportail, National Geographic Institute (IGN) website 
Antras on the 1750 Cassini Map

Communes of Ariège (department)